Margaret Elizabeth Lindemann (born July 21, 1998) is an American singer-songwriter. She is best known for her 2016 breakout single "Pretty Girl", which peaked at number 4 in Sweden, number 6 in Ireland, and number 8 the United Kingdom and the Netherlands. Following the song, Lindemann transitioned her music into pop punk and alternative rock genres with the release of her debut EP, Paranoia (2021). Her debut album, Suckerpunch, was released on September 16, 2022.

Early life 
Margaret Elizabeth Lindemann was born July 21, 1998, in Dallas, Texas, into a German-Scottish family. She began posting recordings of her singing on the social media app Keek, gaining a following both on the app and her other social media accounts. Her career in music began after her manager, Gerald Tennison, discovered a video of her singing on her Instagram page. She then relocated to Los Angeles to pursue music.

Career 
Lindemann's debut single "Knocking On Your Heart" was released in September 2015. Her second single "Couple of Kids" was released on October 30, 2015. On January 29, 2016, her third single "Things" was released. The official music video of "Things" was released on her YouTube channel on February 5, 2016.

On September 29, 2016, Lindemann released the single "Pretty Girl", her first single since signing to 300 Entertainment. The song peaked at number 4 on the Next Big Sound chart. Lindemann wrote the song to "show people that there's more to girls than just being pretty. We have so much to offer. People should get past the physical appearance to something deeper." The music video for "Pretty Girl" premiered through People on March 9, 2017. "Pretty Girl" is Lindemann's first song to ever chart on the US pop radio charts, peaking at number 50. It also peaked at number eight on the UK Singles Chart. Lindemann featured in The Vamps' single "Personal", released October 13, 2017. Lindemann released the single "Obsessed" on November 17, 2017.
On October 26, 2018, she released the single "Human". She released the single "Would I" on November 16, 2018. In March 2019, Lindemann was the supporting act for Sabrina Carpenter on the North American leg of the Singular Tour, and has also opened for The Vamps, as well as Madison Beer on her Life Support Tour in 2021.

Lindemann released the single "Friends Go" on April 24, 2019. The song was later rereleased, featuring Travis Barker. Through 2020, she released four singles; "Knife Under My Pillow", "Gaslight!", "Scissorhands" and "Loner". All four of the songs, as well as four new songs, were included on Lindemann's debut EP, Paranoia, released on January 22, 2021. The EP and Lindemann herself received praise from Alternative Press, who acknowledged her "pop background" and appreciated Lindemann "blending genres and experimenting with rock and metal sounds", and credited her with "keeping emo alive". Lindemann says Avril Lavigne was a big influence on the EP, particularly on "Knife Under My Pillow".

Her song "Crash and Burn" was Radio.com's Alternative Pick of the Week from March 20–27, 2021, which landed Maggie Lindemann's first debut on Mediabase radio chart peaking at number 33. Lindemann hosts a podcast called "swixxzaudio", sharing the name of her record label which she founded in 2020. On the podcast, which currently has 10 episodes and began on April 20, 2020, she has discussed various topics such as the making and release of "Paranoia". She describes the podcast as her "speaking to anyone that wants to listen".

On April 15, 2022, she announced the second single from her upcoming debut album, Suckerpunch. The single, "How Could You Do This to Me", which follows the first single, "She Knows It", released in October 2021, features Kellin Quinn of Sleeping with Sirens and was released on April 29. It was performed live while Lindemann opened for Madison Beer on tour in 2021. The album's title was revealed the same day, and is slated for a release in the third quarter of 2022.The album's third single, "Break Me!" featuring Siiickbrain was released on June 3, 2022. On July 11, Lindemann announced the fourth single of the album, "You're Not Special", which released on July 15. On July 14, she announced Suckerpunch would be released on September 16. On August 12, the fifth single, "Self Sabotage" was released.

Lindemann explained the reason it took her 7 years to come out with her debut album, in which she struggled with constant disappointment in the work she was producing with her label. Along with her music, the singer-songwriter faced several obstacles from leaving her label to devising a new sound that strayed heavily from her bright and bubbly image. Lindemann states that her favorite songs on her sophomore album are “Self-Sabotage” and “Hear Me Out”.

On September 16, 2022, she released her debut album Suckerpunch.

Personal life 
In 2015, a video leaked on Tumblr which showed Lindemann's then boyfriend, Vine star Carter Reynolds, attempting to convince Lindemann into oral sex, despite her continuously saying "this makes me so uncomfortable".

In 2016, Lindemann publicly came out as bisexual. Lindemann was in a relationship with Brandon Arreaga, a member of the boy band PrettyMuch, from 2019 to 2022. In May 2022, Lindemann shared via her Instagram stories that she and Arreaga had broken up. She confirmed to People in September that she is in a relationship with Jordan Clarkson, a professional basketball player for the Utah Jazz of the NBA.

In 2019, while performing in Malaysia, Lindemann was escorted off the stage and arrested for performing without a professional visit pass, as required by all foreigners performing work in the country. She was released on bail the next day, with the event organizers pleading guilty. She has described the incident as "five days of living hell".
In 2022, Lindemann confirmed she underwent breast augmentation.

Influences 
Lindemann credits Lana Del Rey, Banks, and Spooky Black as some of her main influences, calling them "the 'anti pop stars'...off-kilter artists who do their individual thing and are unconcerned with being mainstream." She has credited rock and alternative acts of the early 2000s, such as Gwen Stefani, Avril Lavigne, Paramore, Evanescence and Flyleaf, as influences, saying, "That's actually my favorite time in music, but I felt like I had to hide that side of myself in order to fit this pop princess vibe." Lavigne particularly influenced Lindemann's song "Knife Under My Pillow" and "cages."

Discography

Studio albums

Live albums

Extended plays

Singles

As featured artist

Promotional Singles

Tours
Supporting
 The Vamps - Night & Day Tour (2018)
 Sabrina Carpenter - Singular Tour (2019)
 Madison Beer - Life Support Tour (2021)
 Pvris - UK Tour 2023 (2023)

Headlining
 Suckerpunch World Tour (2023)

Filmography

References

External links 

 Official website

1998 births
Living people
20th-century LGBT people
21st-century American singers
21st-century LGBT people
Alternative rock singers
American alternative rock musicians
American indie pop musicians
American Internet celebrities
American people of German descent
American people of Scottish descent
American pop rock singers
American women singer-songwriters
Atlantic Records artists
Bisexual musicians
Bisexual women
LGBT people from Texas
American LGBT singers
Musicians from Dallas
Pop punk singers
Singer-songwriters from Texas
Warner Music Group artists
American women podcasters
American podcasters